Ferdinand Hýža (born 26 June 1910, date of death unknown) was a Czech wrestler. He competed in the men's Greco-Roman bantamweight at the 1936 Summer Olympics.

References

1910 births
Year of death missing
Czech male sport wrestlers
Olympic wrestlers of Czechoslovakia
Wrestlers at the 1936 Summer Olympics
Place of birth missing